Gillibrand is a surname. Around 2016, 676 people bore the name in Great Britain and none in Ireland. At the time of Great Britain's 1881 census, 608 people bore the name, predominantly in Lancashire. A variant spelling is Gellibrand.

Etymology

The name comes into English from Anglo-Norman. It was borrowed into Anglo-Norman from the medieval Continental West Germanic name Giselbrand, whose first element, gisel, meant 'hostage' and whose second element, brand, meant 'firebrand', 'sword'.

Notable people
People with the surname include:

 Ernest Gillibrand (1901–1976), English football forward
 Ian Gillibrand (1948–1989), English football defender
 Kirsten Gillibrand (born 1966), U.S. senator 
 Nicky Gillibrand, theatrical costume designer

References

See also
 Gellibrand (disambiguation)

English-language surnames